Steven Alessio (born 8 November 1971), is a former Australian rules footballer with the Essendon Football Club. He played 184 games for Essendon between 1992 and 2003. Of Italian descent and named in the VFL/AFL Italian Team of the Century in 2007. Alessio was named as the starting ruckman for Essendon's 'Best of the AFL era' (post-1990) team, named in 2015.

He was reportedly recruited after walking into the clubhouse and asking for a trial, instead of being selected through the player draft. He was given the number 27 guernsey (which had been made famous by Essendon's champion ruckman Simon Madden and has been given to ruckmen ever since). He played in their 2000 premiership team. Alessio was noted for his ability to play forward, averaging more than a goal a game.

At the end of 2002, Alessio was delisted and then re-drafted by Essendon, and accepted only match fees during his final season in 2003. Alessio retired at the end of the 2003 season after 184 games.

After retiring from football he has worked for the Essendon Football Club in a variety of roles, including football operations manager, ruck coach and corporate relationships manager.

Alessio is the uncle of both Matthew Watson, who played for Carlton, and his sister, Liz Watson, an international netball player for Australia.

Playing statistics

|- style="background-color: #EAEAEA"
! scope="row" style="text-align:center" | 1992
|
| 44 || 5 || 2 || 1 || 27 || 29 || 56 || 17 || 8 || 42 || 0.4 || 0.2 || 5.4 || 5.8 || 11.2 || 3.4 || 1.6 || 8.4
|-
! scope="row" style="text-align:center" | 1993
|
| 27 || 12 || 8 || 8 || 73 || 49 || 122 || 42 || 12 || 104 || 0.7 || 0.7 || 6.1 || 4.1 || 10.2 || 3.5 || 1.0 || 8.7
|- style="background-color: #EAEAEA"
! scope="row" style="text-align:center" | 1994
|
| 27 || 18 || 16 || 7 || 116 || 107 || 223 || 66 || 16 || 161 || 0.9 || 0.4 || 6.4 || 5.9 || 12.4 || 3.7 || 0.9 || 8.9
|-
! scope="row" style="text-align:center" | 1995
|
| 27 || 16 || 28 || 12 || 137 || 73 || 210 || 91 || 14 || 85 || 1.8 || 0.8 || 8.6 || 4.6 || 13.1 || 5.7 || 0.9 || 5.3
|- style="background-color: #EAEAEA"
! scope="row" style="text-align:center" | 1996
|
| 27 || 18 || 22 || 14 || 108 || 83 || 191 || 71 || 21 || 121 || 1.2 || 0.8 || 6.0 || 4.6 || 10.6 || 3.9 || 1.2 || 6.7
|-
! scope="row" style="text-align:center" | 1997
|
| 27 || 9 || 11 || 5 || 61 || 43 || 104 || 37 || 8 || 75 || 1.2 || 0.6 || 6.8 || 4.8 || 11.6 || 4.1 || 0.9 || 8.3
|- style="background-color: #EAEAEA"
! scope="row" style="text-align:center" | 1998
|
| 27 || 12 || 15 || 10 || 82 || 63 || 145 || 61 || 14 || 110 || 1.3 || 0.8 || 6.8 || 5.3 || 12.1 || 5.1 || 1.2 || 9.2
|-
! scope="row" style="text-align:center" | 1999
|
| 27 || 22 || 34 || 11 || 168 || 133 || 301 || 114 || 25 || 249 || 1.5 || 0.5 || 7.6 || 6.0 || 13.7 || 5.2 || 1.1 || 11.3
|- style="background-color: #EAEAEA"
! scope="row" style="text-align:center" | 2000
|
| 27 || 24 || 24 || 13 || 125 || 121 || 246 || 83 || 37 || 209 || 1.0 || 0.5 || 5.2 || 5.0 || 10.3 || 3.5 || 1.5 || 8.7
|-
! scope="row" style="text-align:center" | 2001
|
| 27 || 17 || 13 || 11 || 92 || 83 || 175 || 59 || 33 || 207 || 0.8 || 0.6 || 5.4 || 4.9 || 10.3 || 3.5 || 1.9 || 12.2
|- style="background-color: #EAEAEA"
! scope="row" style="text-align:center" | 2002
|
| 27 || 15 || 11 || 6 || 79 || 63 || 142 || 44 || 30 || 145 || 0.7 || 0.4 || 5.3 || 4.2 || 9.5 || 2.9 || 2.0 || 9.7
|-
! scope="row" style="text-align:center" | 2003
|
| 27 || 16 || 9 || 6 || 90 || 48 || 138 || 43 || 12 || 170 || 0.6 || 0.4 || 5.6 || 3.0 || 8.6 || 2.7 || 0.8 || 10.6
|- class="sortbottom"
! colspan=3| Career
! 184
! 193
! 104
! 1158
! 895
! 2053
! 728
! 230
! 1678
! 1.0
! 0.6
! 6.3
! 4.9
! 11.2
! 4.0
! 1.3
! 9.1
|}

References

1971 births
Living people
Australian rules footballers from Victoria (Australia)
Essendon Football Club players
Essendon Football Club Premiership players
Australian people of Italian descent
One-time VFL/AFL Premiership players
People educated at St Joseph's College, Melbourne